The Coir Board is a statutory body established by the Government of India under the Coir Industry Act 1953 (No. 45 of 1953) for the promotion and development of the coir (coconut fibre) industry in India.

It is based in Kochi and Alappuzha. The head office of the Coir Board is in Kochi and the research and training office is at Alappuzha and Bangalore. The coir industry is one of India's traditional industries that is still economically important. The Coir Board has regional offices in different parts of India, wherever there is a significant industry presence. The board works for the promotion, research, education, and training of the industry. The board functions under the Ministry of Micro, Small and Medium Enterprises.

The coir industry employs more than 7 lakh (700,000) people, a majority of whom are from rural areas who belong to economically weaker sections of society.

The Coir Board has worked actively to support the International Year of Natural Fibres 2009.

Shri Sudhir Garg is the current chairman of Coir Board of India.

See also
 Coconut production in Kerala

References

External links
Coir Board of India official portal
Coir Board of India official website
Ministry of Micro, Small and Medium Enterprises, website
Coir Products available in India

Organizations established in 1953
Ministry of Micro, Small and Medium Enterprises
Textile industry of India
Companies based in Kochi
1953 establishments in India
Government agencies of India